Condylopodium is a genus of flowering plants in the family Asteraceae.

 Species
 Condylopodium cuatrecasasii R.M.King & H.Rob. - Colombia
 Condylopodium fuliginosum (Kunth) R.M.King & H.Rob. - Colombia, Ecuador
 Condylopodium gachalanum S.Díaz & G.P.Méndez - Colombia
 Condylopodium hyalinifolium S.Díaz & G.P.Méndez - Colombia
 Condylopodium killipii R.M.King & H.Rob. - Colombia
 Condylopodium pennellii R.M.King & H.Rob. - Colombia

References

Asteraceae genera
Eupatorieae
Flora of South America